Zhuang Zhanggong (December 25, 1894 – February 25, 1962) was a Chinese chemist. He was a founding member of the Chinese Academy of Sciences.

References 

1894 births
1962 deaths
Members of the Chinese Academy of Sciences